Ichthyaetus is a genus of gulls. The genus name is from Ancient Greek ikhthus, "fish", and aetos, "eagle". They were previously included in the genus Larus.

Species

References

 
Bird genera